Crash of the Crown is the seventeenth studio album by American rock band Styx. The album was released on June 18, 2021, by Universal Music Enterprises. The album charted for one week on the US Billboard 200 album chart, peaking at #114 on July 3, 2021.

Track listing

Apart from their 2005 covers album Big Bang Theory, this is the first Styx album since Styx II (1973) to feature no songwriting contribution from James "J.Y." Young.

Personnel
Styx
Tommy ShawAcoustic and electric guitars, mandolin, banjo, vocals
James YoungElectric guitars, vocals
Ricky PhillipsBass guitar except on "Our Wonderful Lives" and "Lost at Sea"
Chuck PanozzoBass guitar on "Our Wonderful Lives" and "Lost at Sea"
Lawrence GowanPiano, B3 organ, synthesizers, Mellotron, vocals
Todd SuchermanDrums and percussion

Additional Personnel
Will EvankovichAcoustic and electric guitars, mandolin, synthesizers, soundscapes, percussion, backing vocals
Michael BahanTablas on "Coming Out the Other Side"
Steve PatrickPiccolo trumpet on "Our Wonderful Lives"

Production
Production - Will Evankovich
Mixing - Will Evankovich, Alan Hertz
Engineering - Alan Hertz, JR Taylor, Scott Rottler, Russ Mackay, Sean Badum, Devan Skaggs, Will Evankovich
Mastering - Ted Jensen
Art Direction, Design, Illustration - Todd Gallopo
Liner Notes - Mike Mettler
Band Photography - Styx
Management - Charlie Brusco
Booking Agent - Rod Essig
A&R Supervision - Mike Ruthig
Production Manager - Alex Sale
Product Manager - Ashley Harris
Legal Clearances - Andrew Labarrere

Charts

References

2021 albums
Styx (band) albums
Universal Music Enterprises albums